Paul-Émile Lamarche (December 21, 1881 – October 11, 1918) was a Canadian lawyer and political figure in Quebec. He represented Nicolet in the House of Commons of Canada from 1911 to 1916 as a Conservative.

He was born in Montreal, the son of Azarie Lamarche and Julia Paquette, and was educated at the Petit Séminaire Saint-Sulpice, the Collège Sainte-Marie de Montréal and the Université Laval. He articled in law with Thomas Chase Casgrain and set up practice in Montreal. Lamarche found himself in opposition to the Conservative party in the House of Commons on the issue of French language instruction in Ontario and bilingual instruction in Manitoba. He resigned his seat in the House of Commons in 1916. Lamarche died two years later at the age of 36.

References

External links
 

Members of the House of Commons of Canada from Quebec
Conservative Party of Canada (1867–1942) MPs
1881 births
1918 deaths